Liu Hsin-hung (born 30 October 1969) is a Taiwanese boxer. He competed for Chinese Taipei at the 1988 Summer Olympics.

References

1969 births
Living people
Taiwanese male boxers
Olympic boxers of Taiwan
Boxers at the 1988 Summer Olympics
Light-flyweight boxers
20th-century Taiwanese people